An idealized cognitive model, or ICM, is the name given in cognitive linguistics to describe the phenomenon in which knowledge represented in a semantic frame is often a conceptualization of experience that is not congruent with reality.  It has been proposed by scholars such as George Lakoff and Gilles Fauconnier.

Bibliography
 George Lakoff (1987) Cognitive models and prototype theory, published at pp. 63–100 in Ulric Neisser (Ed.) Concepts and Conceptual Development: Ecological and Intellectual Factors in Categorization New York, Cambridge University Press.
 Croft, William and Cruse, D. Alan (2004) Cognitive Linguistics, Cambridge: Cambridge University Press. pp. 28– 32

References

Cognitive linguistics